{{Infobox military person
| name          = Julian Neil Frisbie
| birth_date    = 
| death_date    = 
| birth_place   = Virden, Illinois, US
| death_place   = Oakland, California, US
| placeofburial = Golden Gate National Cemetery
| placeofburial_label = 
| image         = Julian N. Frisbie.jpg
| caption       = Julian N. Frisbie as colonel, USMC
| nickname      = 
| allegiance    = United States of America
| branch        =  United States Marine Corps
| serviceyears  = 1917–1948
| rank          =  Brigadier general
| servicenumber = 0-313
| commands      = Portsmouth Naval Prison7th Marine Regiment5th Marine RegimentCoS of 1st Marine Division
| unit          = 
| battles       = World War IBanana Wars
Dominican CampaignNicaraguan CampaignWorld War IIGuadalcanal Campaign
Solomon Islands campaign
Battle of Cape GloucesterChinese Civil War| awards        = Navy CrossSilver StarLegion of Merit
| laterwork     = Warden of Southern Michigan Prison
}}Julian Neil Frisbie' (November 30, 1894 – April 28, 1963) was a highly decorated officer of the United States Marine Corps with the rank of brigadier general, who is most noted for his service as commanding officer of the 7th Marine Regiment during the Battle of Cape Gloucester and later as warden of Southern Michigan Prison during 1952 riots.

Early career

Frisbie was born on November 30, 1894, in Virden, Illinois. He attended Illinois College in Jacksonville, Illinois, and graduated with a bachelor's degree in chemistry in 1917. Frisbie enlisted in the Marine Corps in June 1917 and quickly reached the rank of sergeant. He was subsequently appointed drill instructor at a training center within Marine Barracks Parris Island, South Carolina, and was decorated with the Marine Corps Good Conduct Medal for his service there.

In August 1918, Frisbie was assigned to the Officer Candidates School at Marine Barracks Quantico, Virginia. He graduated from the officer's course on December 15, 1918, and was commissioned second lieutenant on the same date. His first assignment as an officer was with 15th Marine Regiment, which was sent to suppress rebels in Dominican Republic at the end of February 1919.

During his time in Dominican Republic, Frisbie was transferred to the staff of the 2nd Provisional Marine Brigade, where he was appointed aide to the commanding general, Brigadier General Logan Feland. He returned to the United States in July 1921 and subsequently was appointed officer in charge of the Marine Corps Recruiting Station in Cincinnati, Ohio. While serving there, he was promoted to the rank of first lieutenant on October 21, 1922.

Frisbie was transferred to the Marine detachment aboard submarine tender USS Savannah in June 1924 and participated in the cruise to the Gulf of Mexico and later to Hawaii. In April 1925, his detachment was transferred to another submarine tender, USS Camden, and he served with this ship within East Coast of the United States. Frisbie served with USS Camden'' until May 1926, when he was transferred back to Marine Barracks Quantico, Virginia. He subsequently served there on the staff of the commanding general of Marine Corps Expeditionary Force and participated in the Fleet exercises at Guantanamo Bay, Cuba. After return from Cuba, Frisbie served at Quantico Base as assistant to the athletic officer.

He was subsequently assigned again to the 2nd Provisional Marine Brigade and sailed for Nicaragua, where he fought the rebel forces of Augusto César Sandino. For his service during the combat around the village of Santa María, he was decorated with the Nicaraguan Presidential Medal of Merit with Star and Diploma. Frisbie returned to the United States in March 1930 and was assigned to the Marine barracks within Naval Air Station Pensacola, Florida. After two years of service there, he attended the Company Officers's course at Marine Corps School at Quantico Base in June 1932.

After his graduation, Frisbie was transferred to the Marine Corps Base San Diego, California, and after a brief period of service, he was assigned to Marine detachment aboard the cruiser USS Louisville. While serving there, he was promoted to the rank of captain and transferred to the battleship USS Colorado.

Frisbie was back at Marine Base San Diego in June 1935, and, due to his experiences at sea, he was appointed commander of the Sea School Detachment within the San Diego base. He was later appointed base adjutant under the command of Major General Douglas C. McDougal. Frisbie was transferred to the Paymaster Department within Headquarters Marine Corps in Washington, D.C., in January 1938. Promotion to major became effective in March 1938, and Frisbie was appointed post paymaster at Marine Barracks Parris Island, South Carolina, at the same time.

World War II

In April 1941, Major Frisbie was assigned to the 1st Marine Division located at Marine Barracks New River, North Carolina under the command of Major General Holland Smith. He was subsequently appointed commanding officer of the 3rd Battalion, 7th Marine Regiment. During his service in this capacity, Frisbie was promoted to the rank of lieutenant colonel in July 1941. Following the Japanese Attack on Pearl Harbor, 1st Marine Division was deployed to the South Pacific, and Frisbie himself was appointed regimental executive officer in February 1942.

Frisbie served in this capacity with distinction during the Guadalcanal Campaign, and for his efforts and gallantry in action during the defense combat in Lunga Area in late 1942, Frisbie was decorated with the Silver Star. He remained in this capacity until June 22, 1943, when he relieved Colonel Amor L. Sims as commanding officer of the 7th Marine Regiment. His regiment was sent to Australia for rest and refit after heavy fighting at Solomon Islands.

Frisbie commanded the regiment during the next few months of intensive training and preparation for new deployment. During his time in Australia, he was promoted to the rank of colonel in October 1943. Weeks later, he led his regiment during the bloody Battle of Cape Gloucester in New Britain. Colonel Frisbie commanded the initial landing and securing of the beachhead and later defeated Japanese 141st Infantry Regiment. For his actions during the battle, he was decorated with the Navy Cross.

He was relieved by Colonel Herman H. Hanneken on 20 February 1944 and sent back to the United States and assigned to Headquarters Marine Corps. Following one month of duties there, he was transferred to San Diego, where he was appointed commanding officer of the Training Camp within Camp Pendleton.

Later career

Colonel Frisbie was assigned back to his well-known 1st Marine Division in June 1945. He was appointed commanding officer of the 5th Marine Regiment on June 25 and led his regiment to Tientsin, China. For his part in the occupation of North China, Frisbie was decorated with the Legion of Merit and Commendation Medal by the army and with Order of the Cloud and Banner, 5th Grade by the Government of Republic of China.

He commanded 5th Marines until October 15, 1945, when he was transferred to the staff of 1st Marine Division and appointed its chief of staff. Frisbie returned to 5th Marines on July 16, 1946, and commanded this regiment until the end of May 1947, when it was ordered to Guam and reassigned to 1st Provisional Marine Brigade under the command of Brigadier General Edward A. Craig. Frisbie was subsequently appointed 1st Brigade chief of staff on June 1, 1947.

After spending almost three months in this capacity, Frisbie returned to the United States in August 1947 and was appointed commanding officer of the Portsmouth Naval Disciplinary Barracks. He finally retired from the Marine Corps on November 1, 1948, and was advanced to the rank of brigadier general on the retired list for having been specially commended in combat.

Civil career

Following his retirement from the Marine Corps, Frisbie was appointed warden of the Southern Michigan Prison in Jackson, Michigan. The position very similar to his last one in the Marine Corps. In April 1952, two prisoners from the maximum-security prison wing overpowered a guard and released other inmates in their cell block. They took 10 guards as hostages, and after damaging several prison wings they demanded an end to alleged guard's brutality, a change in the parole system, better living conditions and guarantee of no reprisals and other concessions in the exchange for their surrender. Frisbie led the negotiations and finally helped to secure all hostages and establish order again.

Frisbie died of a heart attack on April 28, 1963, at Oak Knoll Naval Hospital and is buried together with his wife, Antoinette L. Frisbie (1896–1994) at Golden Gate National Cemetery in San Bruno, California.

Decorations

Here is the ribbon bar of Brigadier General Julian N. Frisbie:

Navy Cross citation

Silver Star citation

See also
Battle of Guadalcanal

References

1894 births
1963 deaths
People from Virden, Illinois
Illinois College alumni
American prison wardens
United States Marine Corps generals
American military personnel of the Banana Wars
United States Marine Corps personnel of World War I
United States Marine Corps personnel of World War II
Recipients of the Navy Cross (United States)
Recipients of the Silver Star
Recipients of the Legion of Merit
Burials at Golden Gate National Cemetery
Military personnel from Illinois